Between the Lines is a 1977 ensemble drama from Midwest Films. It was directed by Joan Micklin Silver and produced by her husband Raphael D. Silver. The film was nominated for three awards at the 27th Berlin International Film Festival, winning two of them.

Plot
The story revolves around a group of people who work at The Back Bay Mainline, an alternative newspaper in Boston, as it is bought out by a major corporation. This involves Harry Lucas (Heard), a disillusioned lead reporter with an on-and-off again girlfriend in Abbie (Crouse), flaky music critic Max (Goldblum), writer/author Michael (Collins) who plans to move to New York, an eager cub reporter in David (Kirby), and Frank, a beleagured editor in chief (Korkes).  

A series of loose thread occur throughout the film, such as Laura  struggling with her relationship to self-involved Michael, who is using the sale of a forthcoming book to move to New York and take her there. A party celebration only results in Laura going to Harry's house and sleeping before Michael eventually arrives to pick a fight. Laura decides to go along with Michael to New York. David, a youthful reporter who rides a bike to work, tries to hitch a big and potentially dangerous story. Max, Harry, and Abbie try to chase him down from meeting up with a source (they arrive right as he gets a bloody nose). The purchase of the paper by a corporation (specifically a communications empire) had been rumored through the film, but only near the end does it come through that a group headlined by Roy Walsh (Smith) plans to buy and run the paper. One meeting spurs Walsh to ask Frank to fire Harry, citing him as a "moving force in the wrong direction." Lynn the secretary is the first to quit. Harry responds to his firing by walking to Walsh's office and shooting him with a toy gun.

Cast
 John Heard as Harry Lucas
 Lindsay Crouse as Abbie
Jeff Goldblum as Max Arloft
Jill Eikenberry as Lynn
Bruno Kirby as David Entwhistle
Gwen Welles as Laura
Stephen Collins as Michael
Lewis J. Stadlen as Stanley
Jon Korkes as Frank
Michael J. Pollard as The Hawker
 Lane Smith as Roy Walsh 
Joe Morton as Ahmed
 Richard Cox as Wheeler
Marilu Henner as Danielle
 Raymond J. Barry as Herbert Fisk
Gary Springer as Jason
Susan Haskins as Sarah
Guy Boyd as Austin
Charles Levin as Paul

Notes
Fred Barron, who had written for both The Phoenix and The Real Paper, used his alternative newspaper experiences as the basis for his Between the Lines screenplay. The director Silver once had worked for The Village Voice. Doug Kenney, co-founder of the National Lampoon, has a cameo role. Robert Costanzo makes a brief appearance as a hired goon, his second film role.

The success of the film led to a short-lived TV sitcom, also titled Between the Lines.

Reception
The film received positive reviews at the time and is still regarded as an excellent 'snapshot' of the alternative newspaper era. Matthew Monagle of Film School Rejects writes:What makes Between the Lines such a timely film even decades later is its depiction of the diminishing space offered journalism in a world of corporate takeovers. Pages of copy are cut to make way for more advertisements; writers are asked to choose between walking out and compromising their integrity. The film makes it clear that the Back Bay Mainline, even in its diminished capacity, still has its finger on the pulse of the Boston community in a way no major newspaper could. When that is gone, something vital goes with it...<p>Those looking for the newspaper industry’s answer to Broadcast News will find a welcome film in Between the Lines. The film has countless moments of insight into the struggle of the American journalist, from the staff’s shabby living conditions — the film offers perhaps the most realistic look at big city apartments ever committed to film — to how well-meaning writers navigate the competing interests of truth and financial trendlines. With an all-star cast and some great comedic bits — enjoy watching Goldblum engage in a battle with a local performance artist at the Back Bay Mainline headquarters — Between the Lines is a late addition to the already impressive canon of essential 1970s cinema.

References

External links 
 
 
 

1977 films
1977 comedy-drama films
American comedy-drama films
Films about journalists
Films directed by Joan Micklin Silver
Films set in Boston
Films set in Massachusetts
Films shot in Massachusetts
Harvard Square
Vestron Pictures films
1970s English-language films
1970s American films